Delbar-e Rok Rok is a village in Veysian Rural District, Veysian District, Dowreh County, Lorestan Province, Iran. At the 2006 census, its population was 262, in 62 families.

References 

Towns and villages in Dowreh County